Squyres may refer to:
Seaman Squyres, American football player
Steve Squyres, American planetary scientist 
Tim Squyres, American film editor
 Minor planet 10044 Squyres